Akis Agiomamitis is a retired Cypriot international footballer who played as a defender for OFI Crete and is now a football manager.

Club career
Agiomamitis moved to Greece in July 1979, joining Greek first division side OFI Crete. He would stay with OFI for seven seasons in the Greek first division.

International career
Agiomamitis made one appearance for the Cyprus national football team during 1987.

Managerial career
After he retired from playing, Agiomamitis become a manager. He led Aris Limassol F.C. in 2008 and 2009, before managing South African club Mpumalanga Black Aces F.C. in 2009 and 2010.

References

External links

Living people
Cypriot footballers
Cyprus international footballers
Super League Greece players
OFI Crete F.C. players
Apollon Limassol FC players
Expatriate footballers in Greece
Cypriot expatriate footballers
Cypriot expatriate sportspeople in Greece
Cypriot football managers
Aris Limassol FC managers
Association football defenders
Year of birth missing (living people)
Cypriot expatriate football managers
Cypriot expatriate sportspeople in South Africa
Expatriate soccer managers in South Africa
Bloemfontein Celtic F.C. managers